Zhao Hongzhu (born July 1947) is a retired Chinese politician and previously a member of the Chinese Communist Party's national leadership. Zhao served as the Deputy Secretary of the Central Commission for Discipline Inspection (CCDI), the Communist Party's anti-corruption agency, as well as a Secretary of the Central Secretariat.

Zhao spent his early career in Inner Mongolia before being transferred to work for the Ministry of Supervision and the CCDI in Beijing. He was the Communist Party Secretary of Zhejiang province from 2007 to 2012.

Biography
Zhao was born in July 1947 in Ningcheng County in north China's Inner Mongolia Autonomous Region, He is a member of the Han ethnic group and his father was a farmer. He graduated from the Central Party School. He began work in Inner Mongolia, his birthplace, first as a logistics officer. He then entered the Hulunbuir League nomadic administration bureau. Thereafter, he was named to the leadership council of a local ranch, serving as its Disciplinary Secretary. 

In 1980, Zhao entered the party's Organization Department in Hinggan League. He became the head of the department in 1985. In 1988 he became the deputy party chief of Hinggan League. He left Inner Mongolia in 1992 to take on a job in the research office of the Central Commission for Discipline Inspection (CCDI). In 1994, he became the head of the General Office serving the CCDI.

In April 1998, he became the Deputy Minister of Supervision of the People's Republic of China. His tenure lasted until July 2002. In November 2002, Zhao became a standing committee member of the Central Commission for Discipline Inspection and, in November 2003, the Executive Deputy Head of the Organization Department of the Chinese Communist Party. 

Zhao was appointed Party Secretary of Zhejiang in March 2007, taking the office vacated by Xi Jinping, who went on to become party chief of Shanghai. He stepped down as party chief of Zhejiang in November 2012 to take up the number two role in the Communist Party's top anti-corruption body, the Central Commission for Discipline Inspection, under Secretary Wang Qishan. As was customary for the top-ranked CCDI Deputy Secretary, Zhao also became a Secretary of the Central Secretariat at the 18th Party Congress. Since joining the CCDI, Zhao has taken on the role of the leader of a coordination group in charge of implementing specific aspects of the reforms of the discipline and supervision system. Zhao was also put in charge of the Office for the Supervision of Discipline Personnel, an internal audit and control organ of the CCDI. In 2013, Zhao was also named deputy leader of the Central Leading Group for Advancing Mass Line Education.

According to Hong Kong-based news magazine Chengming, Zhao was the top official present when former official Ling Jihua was taken in for investigation.

Zhao is a member of the 17th and 18th Central Committees of the Chinese Communist Party. He is also a member of the 18th Standing Committee of the Central Commission for Discipline Inspection.

References 

1947 births
Living people
People from Chifeng
Political office-holders in Zhejiang
People's Republic of China politicians from Inner Mongolia
Chinese Communist Party politicians from Inner Mongolia
Members of the Secretariat of the Chinese Communist Party